The National Assembly is the unicameral legislative house of the Parliament of Mauritania. The legislature currently has 157 members, elected for five-year terms in electoral districts or nationwide proportional lists.

From 1961 until 1978, the only legal party in the country was the Mauritanian People's Party (PPM). The legislature was disbanded after the 10 July 1978 coup. In 1992, a bicameral legislature was established, consisting the National Assembly and Senate of Mauritania. In the 1990s, a multiparty system was introduced in Mauritania. However, the Democratic and Social Republican Party (PRDS) dominated the parliament until a coup in 2005. After the 2008 military coup, the Union for the Republic has been the dominating force of the National Assembly until it was rebranded as the Equity Party (El Insaf) in 2022.

On October 9, 2018 Cheikh Ahmed Baye was elected President of the National Assembly.

History

Colonial Mauritania
After the Second World War, the French Union was established, granting Colonial Mauritania the right to elect a representative to the French National Assembly and a local assembly. In 1946 a General Council was elected, composed of 20 members elected through censitary suffrage in two electoral colleges, one for French citizens and other for voters with an indigenous status (Mauritanians and nationals of other territories). This council only had a consultative function, debating on local issues and non-political questions.

In 1952 universal suffrage was introduced for the first time, with the creation and election of a 24-member Territorial Council, also elected through two electoral colleges. This Territorial Council soon evolved into the Territorial Assembly, elected in 1957 without the segregation of voters in two colleges. This Territorial Assembly established the first Mauritanian autonomous government under French administration and declared the establishment of the Islamic Republic of Mauritania on 28 November 1958 after a French-backed referendum.

The National Assembly was first elected in 1959 as a constituent assembly to draft a constitution and proclaim the independence of Mauritania from France on 28 November 1960.

Ould Daddah regime
In 1961 this Assembly amended the constitution to change the country's political system from a parliamentary republic to a presidential one.

Number of seats
The number of seats in the National Assembly has varied over the years. In 1959 there were 40 seats, increasing to 50 in 1971, 70 in 1975 (with 7 seats temporarily added during the 1975–1979 Mauritanian occupation of Western Sahara), 79 in 1992, 81 in 2001, 95 in 2006, 146 in 2013, and 157 in 2018. The number of seats will increase in 2023 to 176 after an election reform.

Electoral system
The National Assembly is made up of 157 seats that are elected every five years according to a parallel voting system. 117 seats are filled in 47 electoral districts (four being reserved to the Mauritanian diaspora), which may elect from 1 to 4 seats, except Nouakchott, which elects 18. Districts with one or two seats are elected using a two-round single-member majority ballot, while those with three or more are elected using proportional representation using closed lists. The remaining 40 seats are elected by using proportional representation from two lists with 20 candidates each: a national one and a women-only one, guaranteeing a minimum representation for women in the National Assembly. Lists with more than two candidates must alternate between male and female candidates. There is no electoral threshold.

On 26 September 2022 all Mauritanian political parties reached an agreement sponsored by the Ministry of Interior and Decentralisation to reform the election system ahead of the upcoming elections after weeks of meetings between all parties.

The 176 members (an increase of 17 members compared to 2018) of the National Assembly will be elected by two methods (with Mauritanians being able to cast four different votes in a parallel voting system); 125 are elected from single- or multi-member electoral districts based on the departments (or moughataas) that the country is subdivided in (which the exception of Nouakchott, which has been divided in three 7-seat constituencies for this election based on the three regions (or wilayas) the city is subdivided in instead of the single 18-seat constituency that was used in 2018), using either the two-round system or proportional representation; in single-member constituencies candidates require a majority of the vote to be elected in the first round and a plurality in the second round. In two-seat constituencies, voters vote for a party list (which must contain one man and one woman); if no list receives more than 50% of the vote in the first round, a second round is held, with the winning party taking both seats. In constituencies with three or more seats, closed list proportional representation is used, with seats allocated using the largest remainder method. For three-seat constituencies, party lists must include a female candidate in first or second on the list; for larger constituencies a zipper system is used, with alternate male and female candidates.

It was planned for four seats to be elected by the diaspora, with this election being the first time Mauritanians in the diaspora would have been be able to directly elect their representatives. However, the new electoral law introducing this was struck down as unconstitutional by the Constitutional Council on 10 February 2023.

The remaining 51 seats are elected from three nationwide constituencies, also using closed list proportional representation: a 20-seat national list (which uses a zipper system), a 20-seat women's national list and a new 11-seat youth list (with two reserved for people with special needs), which also uses a zipper system to guarantee the representation of women.

See also
List of presidents of the National Assembly of Mauritania
Senate of Mauritania, former upper house 1992-2017

Footnotes

References

Mauritania
Government of Mauritania
1959 establishments in Mauritania